Glenwood is a village in Cook County, Illinois, United States. The population was 8,662 at the 2020 census.

Geography
Glenwood  is located at  (41.544943, -87.612052).

The Glenwood Shoreline, an ancient shoreline of Lake Chicago, is within the village. The village is almost completely surrounded by forest preserves, as is the nearby village of Thornton.

The neighboring villages are Homewood to the west, Thornton to the north, Lynwood to the east, and Ford Heights and Chicago Heights to the south.

Demographics
As of the 2020 census there were 8,662 people, 2,786 households, and 2,016 families residing in the village. The racial makeup of the village was 75.02% African American, 15.78% White, 0.31% Native American, 0.13% Asian, 0.06% Pacific Islander, 4.03% from other races, and 4.68% from two or more races. Hispanic or Latino of any race were 8.29% of the population.

There were 2,786 households, out of which 66.58% had children under the age of 18 living with them, 38.73% were married couples living together, 29.68% had a female householder with no husband present, and 27.64% were non-families. 26.02% of all households were made up of individuals, and 9.69% had someone living alone who was 65 years of age or older. The average household size was 3.72 and the average family size was 3.04.

The village's age distribution consisted of 26.2% under the age of 18, 9.5% from 18 to 24, 22.6% from 25 to 44, 27.3% from 45 to 64, and 14.4% who were 65 years of age or older. The median age was 38.0 years. For every 100 females, there were 74.5 males. For every 100 females age 18 and over, there were 66.1 males.

The median income for a household in the village was $64,857, and the median income for a family was $73,571. Males had a median income of $42,135 versus $33,824 for females. The per capita income for the village was $25,949. About 8.2% of families and 11.3% of the population were below the poverty line, including 17.9% of those under age 18 and 10.1% of those age 65 or over.

Note: the US Census treats Hispanic/Latino as an ethnic category. This table excludes Latinos from the racial categories and assigns them to a separate category. Hispanics/Latinos can be of any race.

Government
Glenwood is in Illinois's 2nd congressional district.

Education
Public schools in Glenwood include Longwood Elementary School, Hickory Bend Elementary School, Brookwood Middle School, and Brookwood Junior High School. Glenwood Academy (formerly called Glenwood School for Boys and Glenwood School for Boys and Girls) is also located in Glenwood.

Places of worship
St. Andrews Church, St. John Catholic Church, The Spiritual Israel Temple of Glenwood, Calvary Baptist Church of Glenwood and Glenwood Bible Church.

References

External links
Village of Glenwood official website
Glenwood-Lynwood Public Library District

Villages in Illinois
Villages in Cook County, Illinois
Chicago metropolitan area
Populated places established in 1903
1903 establishments in Illinois
Majority-minority cities and towns in Cook County, Illinois